The East Side is a Melrose, Massachusetts neighborhood located on the east side of the city. It stretches roughly from Lebanon Street east to the Saugus, Massachusetts line and is positioned in between the Mount Hood Golf Club neighborhood (to the south) and the Horace Mann neighborhood (to the north).

Description
The area was mostly built out in the early twentieth century with a large majority of the houses being Colonials and Victorians.

A very popular spot in the East Side is the Melrose Common. The park consists of two softball fields, a basketball court, and a playground. The park is the only one of its kind in Melrose and serves as a central meeting place for citywide activities such as summer programs and Fourth of July festivities.

The East Side also contains the two Melrose golf courses. One being Bellevue Golf Course, which is a 9-hole country club. The other golf course is named Mount Hood Golf Club The course consists of 18 holes and is a popular spot for sledding and ice skating in the winter.

Education 
The East Side contains two Kindergarten to fifth grade elementary schools operated by Melrose Public Schools: Winthrop School and Hoover School.

Transportation 
The East Side is the closest Melrose neighborhood to Saugus and US Route 1. Additionally, MBTA bus route 131 runs to and from Melrose Highlands through the East Side to Malden Center Station or Oak Grove Station on the MBTA Orange Line during the morning and evening rush hours as well as in the afternoon.

External links
 Melrose Official Website

Melrose, Massachusetts
Neighborhoods in Massachusetts
Populated places in Middlesex County, Massachusetts